Michael Willie (born Jun 17, 1990) is an American football wide receiver who is currently a free agent. He was signed as an undrafted free agent by the San Diego Chargers in 2012. He played college football for Arizona State University.

Early years
Willie attended Woodrow Wilson Classical High School in Long Beach, California. He was named to the All-CIF and All-Moore League teams. He had 700 receiving yards and six receiving touchdowns in his senior season in high school.

College career

Cerritos College
Willie attended Cerritos College out of high school, where he continued his football career. While at Cerritos, Willie had some of the highest receiving totals in California.

Arizona State
In his two seasons at Arizona State, Willie had 72 receptions, 897 receiving yards and 9 receiving touchdowns.

Professional career

San Diego Chargers
In 2012, Willie signed with the San Diego Chargers to join the practice squad. On August 27, 2013, he was placed on the reserve/injured list. On August 31, 2013, he was waived with an injury settlement.

Baltimore Ravens
The Baltimore Ravens signed Willie after a successful minicamp tryout on June 20, 2014. The Ravens released Willie on August 25, 2014.

San Jose SaberCats
On July 20, 2015, Willie was assigned to the San Jose SaberCats of the Arena Football League.

Winnipeg Blue Bombers 
On August 23, 2015, Willie was signed to the practise roster of the Winnipeg Blue Bombers of the Canadian Football League.

On September 29, 2015, Willie was released.

Los Angeles KISS
On March 10, 2016, Willie was assigned to the Los Angeles KISS. On May 14, 2016, Willie was placed on reassignment. On May 18, 2016, Willie was assigned to the KISS once again.

References

External links
 Arizona State profile

1990 births
Living people
American football wide receivers
Arizona State Sun Devils football players
Baltimore Ravens players
San Diego Chargers players
Cerritos Falcons football players
San Jose SaberCats players
Players of American football from Long Beach, California
Players of American football from Compton, California
African-American players of American football
Los Angeles Kiss players